Central Park in Jakarta, Indonesia is a mixed-use complex including a shopping mall, an office tower, three apartment buildings, and a hotel covering an area of about  located in the district of Grogol Petamburan, West Jakarta developed by the Agung Podomoro Group and part of Podomoro City development. Central Park is currently the 17th largest building in the world based on floor area.

History 
Central Park Jakarta was inaugurated on 9 September 2009, on the site of Integrated Mega Projects of Podomoro City that was located in West Jakarta. The main principle was Singaporean DP Architects, while American DYXY acted as the interior designer, and American Bennit Design Group as the landscape consultant. The main contractor for the complex was Total Bangun Persada. It was named after the original Central Park in New York City. Central Park Jakarta is situated in between Mall Taman Anggrek and Mall Ciputra.

Architecture 

Neo Soho, a new shopping center icon by Agung Podomoro Land with an eight-storey “store within-a-store” concept, has been built and connects to Central Park through the iconic Eco Sky Walk. The shopping mall features a musical fountain at the park area with daily shows. It also features a large outdoor park, with some tenants, named Tribeca Park.

Tenants 
The shopping mall has anchor tenants such as Sogo (the largest SOGO in Indonesia), Carrefour Transmart, Gramedia, Zara, Topman, Marks & Spencer, Hugo Boss, Bershka, and others. The Jakarta Aquarium & Safari, one of the biggest aquariums in the city, is also located inside the shopping mall.

Awards
 Asia Pacific Highly Commended Retail (Asia Pacific Property Awards 2011).
 National Best Retail Development (Asia Pacific Property Awards 2011).

Incidents

Fire 
In November 2016, the cladding on the Neo-Soho tower ignited. A similar fire at Grenfell Tower occurred in September 2017.

Gallery

See also
List of largest buildings in the world

References

Shopping malls in Jakarta
West Jakarta